Marco Gómez may refer to:

 Marco Gómez (footballer, born 1984), Mexican football midfielder
 Marco Gómez (footballer, born 2000), Venezuelan football defender